Susan Moody (born 1940 in Oxford) is the principal pen name of Susan Elizabeth Horwood, an English novelist best known for her suspense novels.

After marrying Professor John Dalgleish Donaldson in Oxford, Oxfordshire, on 5 September 2001, she became the stepmother of his four children, including Crown Princess Mary of Denmark.

Biography
Moody grew up in Oxford, then lived in France where she met her first husband. They moved to Tennessee where she lived for 10 years before returning home.

In 1983, she published her first novel, A Distant Shore, and one other historical novel under the pen name Susannah James before she turned to the genre of crime and suspense literature. More recently, she has also used the pen name Susan Madison.

Moody is a former Chairman of the Crime Writer's Association, served as World President of the International Association of Crime Writers, and has been elected to the prestigious Detection Club. She has led numerous courses on writing crime fiction and continues to tutor creative writing courses in England, France, Australia, and Denmark.

Bibliography
Amateur detective Penny is a 6 ft beautiful black photographer and the daughter of a UN Ambassador.
Penny Black (1984) (#56 among The Top 100 Crime Novels of All Time)
Penny Dreadful (1984)
Penny Post (1985)
Penny Royal (1986)
Penny Wise (1988)
Penny Pinching (1989)
Penny Saving (1993)

Cassie Swann series
Cassie Swann is an expert bridge player in England.
 Takeout Double (Also published as: Death Takes a Hand) (1993)
 Grand Slam        (1994)
 King of Hearts    (1995)
 Doubled in Spades (1996)
 Sacrifice Bid 	(1997)
 Dummy Hand        (1998)

Stand Alones
Playing With Fire; (Mosaic, USA).
Hush-a-bye
House of Moons
Misselthwaite :  a sequel to Frances Hodgson Burnett's novel The Secret Garden;(Return to the Secret Garden, USA).
Falling Angel
The Italian Garden
The Colour of Hope
Touching The Sky
Letters From Kirsten (Denmark)
Losing Nicola
Dancing in the Dark

Other
A Distant Shore, an historical novel set in the royal harem of Istanbul.
Lucia's Legacy, an historical novel set in Spain in the 1800s.
Love Over Gold, the novelisation of the Nescafé Gold Blend couple advertisements.
Hatchards Crime Companion: The top 100 crime novels of all time selected by The Crime Writers Association, edited by Susan Moody.

Short Stories
Moody has written a number of well received short stories which have appeared in many anthologies.

References

External links

1940 births
English crime fiction writers
English mystery writers
Living people
Women mystery writers
English women novelists